The 2020 Mid-Eastern Athletic Conference men's basketball tournament was the postseason men's basketball tournament for the Mid-Eastern Athletic Conference. The tournament was scheduled to be held from March 10 through March 14, 2020 at the Norfolk Scope in Norfolk, Virginia. The winner would have received the conference's automatic bid to the NCAA tournament.

The tournament was canceled on March 12, 2020 after four games had already been played due to the COVID-19 pandemic. The tournament was the last scheduled conference tournament to be canceled.

Seeds 
10 eligible teams (Florida A&M self-imposed a postseason ban for 2020 due to improper certification of student-athletes) were seeded by record within the conference, with a tiebreaker system to seed teams with identical conference records. The top four teams received a first-round bye.

Schedule

Source:

Bracket

* denotes overtime period

References

Tournament
MEAC men's basketball tournament
MEAC men's basketball tournament
MEAC men's basketball tournament
MEAC men's basketball tournament
Basketball competitions in Norfolk, Virginia
College basketball tournaments in Virginia